Mihail Sava (born 3 September 1991) is a Moldovan freestyle wrestler. He won one of the bronze medals in the 70 kg event at the 2020 European Wrestling Championships held in Rome, Italy.

Career 

In 2014, he won one of the bronze medals in the 65 kg event at the World Wrestling Championships held in Tashkent, Uzbekistan. In his bronze medal match he defeated Mustafa Kaya of Turkey.

In 2015, he competed in the men's freestyle 65 kg event at the European Games without winning a medal. In 2016, he won the silver medal in the men's 65 kg event at the 2016 World University Wrestling Championships held in Çorum, Turkey. He also competed in the 70 kg event at the 2018 World Wrestling Championships without winning a medal. He was eliminated in his second match by Adam Batirov.

Major results

References

External links 
 

Living people
1991 births
Place of birth missing (living people)
Moldovan male sport wrestlers
Wrestlers at the 2015 European Games
European Games competitors for Moldova
World Wrestling Championships medalists
European Wrestling Championships medalists
20th-century Moldovan people
21st-century Moldovan people